Jeanne Vanoverloop (23 February 1913 – 11 October 1931) was a French gymnast. She competed in the women's artistic team all-around event at the 1928 Summer Olympics.

References

External links
 

1913 births
1931 deaths
French female artistic gymnasts
Olympic gymnasts of France
Gymnasts at the 1928 Summer Olympics
20th-century French women